Indy Tahau (born 22 October 2002) is an Australian rules footballer who plays for Brisbane in the AFL Women's (AFLW).

Tahau was raised by New Zealand parents in Cunnamulla, Queensland to the age of nine where she played junior rugby league before moving to Adelaide and taking up Australian rules.

Tahau made her debut in the Lions' round 4 game against  at Hickey Park on 21 February 2021.

References

External links
 

2002 births
Living people
South Adelaide Football Club players (Women's)
Sportswomen from Queensland
Australian rules footballers from Queensland
Brisbane Lions (AFLW) players
Port Adelaide Football Club (AFLW) players